Segmentina is a genus of very small, air-breathing, freshwater snails, aquatic gastropod mollusks or micromollusks in the family Planorbidae, the ramshorn snails.

Albrecht et al. (2007) have confirmed the placement of this genus in the tribe Segmentinini within subfamily Planorbinae.

Species
Species in this genus include:
Segmentina avecenninae 
Segmentina bouilleti 
Segmentina bugense 
Segmentina cantori 
Segmentina caucasica 
Segmentina chevalieri 
Segmentina congenera 
Segmentina distinguenda 
Segmentina drenici 
Segmentina filocincta 
Segmentina haueri 
Segmentina lartetii 
Segmentina loczyi 
Segmentina malkae 
Segmentina mica 
Segmentina molytes 
Segmentina montgazoniana 
Segmentina nitida 
Segmentina nitidella 
Segmentina oelandica 
 Segmentina paparyensis 
Segmentina parva 
Segmentina petropolitana 
Segmentina roskai 
Segmentina sandbergeri 
Segmentina servaini 
Segmentina starobogatovi 
Segmentina stenomphalus 
Segmentina usta

References

External links 
 Segmentina at AnimalBase

Planorbidae